The Hong Kong Ice Hockey League is the national ice hockey league in Hong Kong.

Champions
 2017: Hexagon
 2016: HKIHA
 2015: Penguins
 2014: Golden Castle
 2013: Golden Castle
 2012: Coors Light
 2011: Penguins
 2010: HKGFM
 2009: Returning Hope
 2007: Sam Wai
 2005: Hong Kong 3
 2001: Distacom Devils
 2000: Nike Jets
 1999: Bud Gold
 1998: Dharmala Jets
 1997: Dharmala Jets

References

External links
Hong Kong Ice Hockey Association Official Website

Ice hockey competitions in Hong Kong
Ice hockey leagues in Asia
Professional ice hockey leagues in China